CKPC-FM (92.1 FM, Lite 92) is a radio station in Brantford, Ontario. Owned by Evanov Communications, it broadcasts a soft adult contemporary format, billed as "Southern Ontario's Lite Favourites". With an 80,000 watt signal, the station serves a very large area, including the Waterloo Region, Hamilton, the Niagara region, the greater London area and the western suburbs of the Greater Toronto Area. The studios are located at 571 West St in Brantford while its transmitter located near Brant Rd 24 and McLean School Rd north of Brantford.

Target market
The station's format is designed to attract and cater to the adult audience aged 35+ in South Western Ontario and is actively rated in both the Hamilton and Kitchener/Waterloo markets.  The station is powered by strong signal, reaching much of the population of Southern and Southwestern Ontario, although the Greater Toronto Area is targeted by CKDX-FM. CKPC-FM provides relevant news, traffic reports and regional advertising.

The station is available on-line via streaming, on services such as Streema, Online Radio Box, Radio Canada Online and iHeartRadio.

History

1933 - Cyrus Dolph begins to operate an AM radio station in Preston (Cambridge), purchased from Wallace Russ, after it had operated as an amateur radio station since 1923
1934 - CKPC moves to 930 kHz on the AM dial, moving to 1380 kHz in 1935
1936 - Power increases to 100 watts; now in Brantford, it operates as Telephone City Broadcast Ltd.
1947 - CKPC applies for an FM licence
1949 - CKPC-FM begins broadcasting at 94.7 FM at 250 watts, simulcasting CKPC.
1951 - Florence Dolph Buchanan, among the first women in broadcasting (and the first woman in Canada to own/operate a radio station), takes full control of the station, now with a 1,000–watt signal, from her father Cyrus
1955 - CKPC-FM changes frequency to 92.1 MHz; slogan for both AM and FM stations is "The Established Voice of Industrial Ontario"
1959 - Signal increases to 10,000 watts
1962 - CKPC-FM introduces some original programming, independent of CKPC (AM)
1971 - CKPC-FM becomes completely independent, with all original programming
1972 - Richard Buchanan purchases Telephone City Broadcast Ltd. from his mother
1976 - Signal increases to 50,000 watts
2008 - Signal increases to 80,000 watts; 
2008 - Richard Buchanan July 29 loses battle with cancer
2009 - Telephone City Broadcast Limited is purchased by Evanov Communications
2009 - Station name changed from FM 92.1 to The New 92; format moves from hot adult contemporary to adult contemporary
2010 - Station rebrands as The Jewel or Jewel 92, playing "the best current hits, recent favourites, and timeless classics". 

2021 - In June, CKPC-FM dropped its Jewel 92 branding and rebranded the station as Lite 92 - "Southern Ontario's Lite Favorites", previously "Lite Favourites".

HD Radio
On November 18, 2019, CKPC-FM launched HD Radio multi-casting services. The HD1 sub-channel carries the same programming as the standard analog frequency. As of September 4, 2020, the HD2 sub-channel carries a simulcast of sister station CFWC-FM, the HD3 sub-channel carries a simulcast of CKPC.

References

External links
 
 
 

Radio stations established in 1949
Kpc
Kpc
1949 establishments in Ontario